The Parlour Club was a venue located on Santa Monica Boulevard in West Hollywood, California and managed by Andrew Gould. Among its notable events included the speakeasy-themed night Bricktops (established by Vaginal Davis), series of spoken-word sessions The Unhappy Hour (created by Lydia Lunch with Andrew Gould), and performance art night Touché (created by Clint Catalyst).

Notable performers and hosts 
 Lydia Lunch
 Shawna Kenney
 Pleasant Gehman
 Clint Catalyst
 Jake La Botz
 Vaginal Davis
 Mary Woronov
 Velvet Hammer

References 

Former music venues in California
Music venues in Los Angeles
West Hollywood, California
Event venues established in 2002
2002 establishments in California
Defunct companies based in Greater Los Angeles